Ngalla Maya is a Western Australian non-profit organisation benefiting Aboriginal Australians and Torres Strait Islanders newly released from prison. The organisation mentors and trains newly released prisoners and helps them find employment. The ex-prisoner population of Aboriginal and Torres Strait Islander peoples is at high risk of committing suicide. As of May 2016 the organisation receives no funding from the Government of Australia,  but is wholly community supported.

The founder and CEO of Ngalla Maya is Mervyn Eades, recognised in consecutive years at the National Indigenous Human Rights Awards, for his transformative work in prison to community and employment - recipient of the 2016 Eddie Mabo Social Justice Award and the 2017 Dr Yunupingu Human Rights Award.

Prominent suicide prevention researcher and prison to work reformer, Gerry Georgatos has been a supporter of Ngalla Maya, writing in national media, "There are only a few organisations and programs authentically transforming the lives of inmates and former inmates. One of the most successful programs is Ngalla Maya, a prison to wellbeing, to training and education, to employment effort founded by a former inmate, Noongar man Mervyn Eades."

Georgatos also stated in 2017, "In the past year, Ngalla Maya inspired more than 140 inmates to participate in training and educational programs. They are now employed. No other program has achieved these results. Despite receiving support from the Federal Government, the Western Australian government has not given it a single penny."

Georgatos identified, "In Western Australia, more than 90 per cent of inmates have not completed a Year 12 education; more than 60 per cent have not completed Year 10; and more than 40 per cent have not completed Year 9. One in six of the state’s Aboriginal people have been to prison."

"In Western Australia, the rate of imprisonment of Aboriginal and/or Torres Strait Islander children is 50 per cent higher than the imprisonment rate of black children in the US. Australia incarcerates Aboriginal juveniles at 37 per 10,000, whereas the United States is at 52 per 10,000, according to the US Justice Department. However, Western Australia incarcerates Aboriginal children at 78 per 10,000."

Ngalla Maya's record breaking success has led the Commonwealth as of May 2019 to further fund Ngalla Maya to transform the lives of a further 220 ex-justice (recently released prisoners) candidates.

'Ngalla Maya' is a Noongar phrase meaning 'our place'.

References

External links
 Ngalla Maya

Organisations serving Indigenous Australians
Human rights organisations based in Australia
Institutional abuse
Anti-indigenous racism in Australia